Chejerla is a village and a Mandal in Nellore district in the state of Andhra Pradesh in India.

Demographics 
As of 2001 India census, Chejerla had a population of 6172.  Males constitute 52% of the population and females 48%. Chejerla has an average literacy rate of 65.89%, less than the Andhra pradesh average of 67.02%: male literacy is 74%, and female literacy is 57%.

Geography 
It has an average elevation of 48 meters (160 feet).

References 

Villages in Nellore district